The Silk Roads: A New History of the World is a 2015 non-fiction book written by Peter Frankopan, a historian at the University of Oxford. A new abridged edition was illustrated by Neil Packer. The full text is divided into 25 chapters. The author combines the development of the world with the Silk Road, describing religion, war, wealth, and peace on the Silk Road.

Summary 
The traditional view is that Western civilization descends from the Romans, who were in turn heir to the Greeks, who, in some accounts, were heirs to the Egyptians. Frankopan argues that the Persian Empire was the actual centre point of the rise of Western civilization.

In the 4th century BC, gold commodities were exchanged along with slaves. In the next few thousand years, the formation of various ideas such as Buddhism, Christianity and Islam spread along the Silk Road. Genghis Khan led the Mongol westward conquest and promoted the exchange between the East and the West. Through continuous expansion and colonization, the British Empire established an empire on which the sun never sets. Hitler started the war for the resources on the Silk Road.

Influence 

Reviews on The Silk Roads were generally positive. Positive reviews appeared in The Guardian, The Independent, The Telegraph, The Times. and The New York Review of Books. The Guardian'''s review of the book in 2015 was positive: "The Silk Roads is full of intriguing insights and some fascinating details". As early as 1587, playwright Christopher Marlowe referred to Persia/Iran as "the centre of the globe," and many historians agreed. Francopan, on the other hand, went further than many others before him, diving deeper into the archives and quoting more manuscripts to support his argument. The Independent considers the book "A bold, if imperfect, study that paints a picture of the past from a new perspective". The New York Times commented that "The danger of glibness is never far, but it is always held off, and I have to say that 'Silk Roads' is what my old friend the historian Norman Stone used to describe as 'an old-fashioned good book'". 

Frankopan was struck by the overwhelming response to the book from readers. Frankopan did not expect so many people to be interested in this book. Frankopan made readers aware of the differences between past and present regions of the world and made people aware that Eurocentrism was no longer true. According to Frankopan, the Belt and Road Initiative proposed by Chinese president Xi Jinping will probably lead to rapid economic growth in China and other neighboring countries. He also believes that China, to provide for its current needs, is trying to build new "silk roads", even though to realise them it could take at least three decades. Moreover, as society is constantly changing, people should take a long-term and critical view of their national development.

 Reception 

 Praise 

According to anthropologist and archaeologist Nikolay Kradin, each chapter's heading is highly intriguing. Chapter 8, titled "The Road to Heaven", for example, recounts the history of the Crusades. He adds that Frankopan masterfully balances history with literature, so that the book is accessible even to those who are unfamiliar with history. For researchers K. Laug and S. Rance, one of the reasons for the book's success in drawing readers is because of these intriguing headlines. Moreover, the economic growth of the East has been driven by an increase in demand in the West as a result of the development of the economy. They concluded that the advent of the Silk Road caused countries to seek shared interests as a result of a lack of collaboration among European countries. The rise of fascism reflected a change in the economic balance of power. In the shifting economic and political structure of Western countries, Frankopan rightly points out the weaknesses of liberal democracy. M. Sanmartí found several minor inaccuracies in the book, as well as other components that were missing, although for a 650-page book this may be considered insignificant. He concludes his study by telling the reader that this book is an anti-Eurocentrism collection, not a tool for comprehending world history. Although the title "A New History of the World" is not entirely suit, the rigorous historical content and intriguing anecdotes appeal to the broad reader.

 Criticism 
According to the aforementioned K. Laug and S. Rance, the Silk Road helped India's economy to grow swiftly, but Frankopan failed to account for the country's rapid population expansion and the increasing wealth gap. Sanmartí disagrees with Frankopan's assertion that there is no longer any space on Earth for nations to compete for, implying that Eurasia would return to its former position as the world's centre. There are still many places on Earth that are covered by water that have not been explored, and people are still exploring planets beyond Earth. The emergence of renewable energy may lead to the decline of oil in the Middle East, and people are still exploring planets beyond Earth.

Frankopan's dismissive attitude towards Northern European engagement in the Asian slave trade, while ignoring the substantial demand for such captives in Central Asian and Middle Eastern markets, is also problematic. Throughout the book, Frankopan emphasizes the Europeans' heinous activities while ignoring the equally heinous atrocities committed simultaneously in Eurasia.

Guha argues that from the beginning of the book through Columbus' voyages, the description of the Black Death brings the subject into the modern part, and afterwards it has lost the "focus" it was meant to express. A new history of the world does not need to include extensive descriptions of the Nazi and Soviet truce of 1939-1941. Moreover, the conflicts content in Afghanistan and Iraq is unnecessary. To Guha the book provides an outdated history that lacks a description of much of human life. Frankopan focuses more on describing urban civilization: Being the history of the city the main object of description, its main characters are mostly warriors, rulers, merchants and priests. Poor people and women do not appear. Frankopan points out the role in history of mainly European personalities, without mentioning figures such as Mustafa Kemal Atatürk or Ho Chi Minh.

 Extension 

 The New Silk Road 

Although The New Silk Roads is a stand-alone book, it is more intended as a continuation of the Silk Roads. According to M. Ranasinghe, this book fits better into a modern context. Frankopan largely echoes the theme of his last book, The Silk Roads:  A New History of the World''. He has researched everything from the relevance of China's "One Belt, One Road" strategy to the international dispute between Dubai and Djibouti over a port in East Africa. Frankopan supports his point by citing numerous political accounts. In Frankopan's book, readers are encouraged not to be influenced by media feuds, but to consider what they can learn from Eastern cultures. At the same time, Frankopan also emphasized the important value of strengthening exchanges and partnerships in various countries around the world.

See also 
 Silk Road

References 

History books about Iran
2015 non-fiction books
Books about politics of Iran
History books about the Middle East
History books about Asia
Eurasian history
Silk Road
Bloomsbury Publishing books